Brian Herosian (born September 14, 1950) is a former professional defensive back in the National Football League and the Canadian Football League. 

A native of Worcester, Massachusetts, Herosian attended Worcester Academy, where he excelled in football, basketball, and baseball, graduating in 1969. He matriculated to the University of Connecticut where he starred in football and baseball. Herosian played for the Falmouth Commodores of the Cape Cod Baseball League in 1971 and 1972. At Falmouth, he was named a league all-star in 1971, and fanned 15 batters in a game in 1972. Herosian played in the 1972 College World Series and was drafted by the New York Yankees in the fourth round of the secondary phase of the 1973 Major League Baseball draft.

Herosian played for the Baltimore Colts in 1973, and went on to play for the Winnipeg Blue Bombers of the Canadian Football League from 1975 to 1979.

References

1950 births
Living people
Players of American football from Worcester, Massachusetts
Worcester Academy alumni
American football defensive backs
UConn Huskies football players
UConn Huskies baseball players
Baltimore Colts players
American players of Canadian football
Winnipeg Blue Bombers players
Falmouth Commodores players